The 2010 Maidstone Borough Council election took place on 6 May 2010 to elect members of Maidstone Borough Council in Kent, England. One third of the council was up for election and the Conservative Party stayed in overall control of the council.

After the election, the composition of the council was:
Conservative 28
Liberal Democrat 23
Independent 4

Election result
The results saw the Conservatives hold control of the council after winning half of the seats being elected. This meant the Conservatives remained on 28 seats, while the Liberal Democrats gained 2 to hold 23 seats. Meanwhile, 2 independents lost seats, meaning there were 4 independents on the council after the election. Overall turnout in the election was 66%.

The Liberal Democrats gained 3 seats from the Conservatives in the wards of Bridge, East and South, including defeating the cabinet member for leisure and Conservative deputy leader, Brian Moss, in Bridge. However the Conservatives took a seat back from the Liberal Democrats in Park Wood and the Conservatives also gained 2 seats from independents. The Conservatives gains from independents came in Bearsted and Shepway South, with the independent group leader, Pat Marshall, losing in Bearsted.

Ward results

References

2010 English local elections
May 2010 events in the United Kingdom
2010
2010s in Kent